Heart-hand syndrome, Spanish type, also known as heart-hand syndrome type 3 or III, is a very rare genetic disorder which is characterized by heart, hand, and sometimes feet abnormalities. It is a type of heart-hand syndrome, a class of genetic disorders characterized by cardiac malformations and hand malformations. Only one family with the disorder has been reported in medical literature.

Description 

People with this disorder have symptoms that affect the heart, hands and feet. These include:

Heart 

 Sick sinus
 Bundle branch block

Hands 

 Brachydactyly which resembles brachydactyly type C
 Abnormal development of the middle phalanges of the fingers
 Accessory ossicle on the proximal phalange of the index finger.

Feet 

 Subtle feet anomalies such as syndactyly

Etimology 

This condition was first discovered by Ruiz de la Fuente et al., when they described a 3-generation family from Spain with the symptoms mentioned above. The cardiac defects varied between family members; 3 members had intraventicular conduction defects and 1 had a sick sinus.  In this family, the 2nd and 5th fingers were the most severely affected out of all the fingers. Autosomal dominant inheritance was suspected.

References 

Autosomal dominant disorders
Genetic diseases and disorders